The Battle of Tanagra took place in 457 BC between Athens and Sparta during the First Peloponnesian War. Tension between Athens and Sparta had built up due the rebuilding of Athens' walls and Spartan rejection of Athenian military assistance. The Athenians were led by Myronides and held a strength of 14,000. The Spartans were led by Nicomedes and had a total of 11,500 soldiers. Both sides suffered losses; however, the Spartans left victorious.

Background

Although it had won a hegemony over the Greek city-states from its leadership in the Persian Wars, the Spartan-led Peloponnesian League feared the growing power of the Athenian empire and worsened relations by repeated diplomatic affronts and demands.

Wanting to deny any future Persian invasion a base from which to operate, Sparta had urged Athens, along with other Greek cities, to refrain from rebuilding their walls. However, suspecting a Spartan ploy and having already begun the work of construction, Athens employed subterfuge to delay the wheels of diplomacy until she could finish them. In 458 BC, Athens began building the Long Walls, a defensive structure that secured the communication lines between the city and Piraeus. Like other walls that were built, it allowed the Athenians to refuse battle and retreat without fear of being cut from supplies coming from the sea.

In 464 BC, suffering another Helot rebellion and failing to make progress in the siege against their stronghold Ithome, Sparta had asked for Athens' aid along with its other allies. A "considerable force" was sent out to support the Spartans at the urging of Cimon, who was appointed its commander. Sparta, fearing the "unorthodox" politics of Athens and the possibility of her supporting the enslaved Helots rather than fighting them, sent the Athenian contingent home while keeping on the rest of her allies. The humiliation from this incident led Athens to adopt a more anti-Spartan foreign policy.

Deeply offended by these Spartan interferences and insults, Athens was increasingly willing to support discord within the Peloponnesian League and took Megara into its protection during its border dispute with the Spartan-allied Corinth, leading to open war with Corinth but not Sparta herself.

The battle
When the Phocians made war on the cities of Doris—the traditional homeland of Doric Greeks—the Doric Sparta sent a relief force under the command of Nicomedes, son of Cleombrotus, acting as regent for his under-age nephew, King Pleistoanax. An army of 1,500 Spartan hoplites with 10,000 of their allies entered Boeotia and compelled the submission of Phocis.

Athens, already contemptuous of Spartan treatment and now suspecting her of negotiating with factions within the city to undermine democracy and prevent the construction of the Long Walls, maneuvered to cut off the Spartan army isolated in Boeotia.

Facing either transport through waters controlled by the Athenian navy or a difficult march through the Geraneia mountain passes held by Athenian soldiers supported from Megara, the Spartans decided to wait either for the opening of a safe route home or an outright Athenian assault.

Meeting the Spartans at Tanagra, Athens fielded "their whole army, supported by 1,000 troops from Argos and by contingents from their other allies, making up altogether a force of 14,000 men." Fernando Echeverría states that there is no record of the tactics that were used during the actual battle.

The Athenian politician and general Cimon, who had been exiled from Athens 3 years prior, came to the Athenian camp to offer to fight but was sent away.

Aftermath
Although both sides sustained "great losses", the Spartans were victorious and now able to return home through the mountain passes of the Isthmus, cutting down the fruit trees once crossing into the Megarid along the journey home. Sixty two days after the battle, the Athenians regrouped under the command of Myronides. They then defeated Thebes at the Battle of Oenophyta and took control of Boeotia, taking down the wall the Spartans had built and taking one hundred of the richest men of the Opuntian Locris as hostages. With the victory, the Athenians also occupied Phocis, the original source of the conflict and the Opuntian Locris. A few years down the road, Cimon was eventually called back to Athens after being ostracized and sent away from the Battle of Tanagra. He then helped create a five year peace treaty between Athens and Sparta.

References

457 BC
450s BC conflicts
First Peloponnesian War
Tanagra 457 BC
Tanagra 457 BC